J9, J09, J 9 or J-9 may refer to:

Military 
 Chengdu J-9, a designation assigned to a 1975 Chinese interceptor aircraft that never progressed beyond initial studies
 , a 1940 British Royal Navy 
 Junkers J 9, a factory designation for the 1917 German Junkers D.I fighter aircraft
 Seversky J9, a Swedish WW2 fighter plane'

Transport 
 County Route J9 (California), a main route between the cities of Oakdale, Waterford, and Turlock
 GS&WR Class J9, a Great Southern and Western Railway steam locomotive
 Guinee Airlines, a defunct airline of Guinea
 Jazeera Airways, a Kuwaiti airline
 Malaysia Federal Route J9, a major road in Johor, Malaysia
 Peugeot J9, a fullsize van manufactured from 1981 to 2010

Other uses 
 J9 (album), a 2004 album by Jolin Tsai
 J9 Series, a trilogy of Japanese anime robot series
 Elongated pentagonal pyramid (J9), a Johnson solid
 IBM J9, an implementation of Java
 S/2000 J 9, now called Taygete, a retrograde irregular satellite of Jupiter
 S/2001 J 9, now called Orthosie, a natural satellite of Jupiter
 S/2003 J 9, a retrograde irregular satellite of Jupiter